Vezirköprü is a district of Samsun Province of Turkey. It is named after the Ottoman Albanian grand vizier Köprülü Mehmed Pasha.

History 
At the breakup of Alexander the Great's empire the Vezirköprü region became part of the kingdom of Pontus with its capital at Amaseia (Amasya), later at Sinope (Sinop). When the last king Mithradates VI was defeated by the Romans, Pompey the Great founded a "new city", Neapolis, which later changed its name to Neoklaudioupolis (Νεοκλαυδιούπολις) or Neoclaudiopolis in Latin, the forerunner of modern Vezirköprü. In late antiquity, the town returned to its original name, Andrapa (Ἄνδραπα), and became a bishopric. It also minted coins bearing the dates and effigies of Marcus Aurelius, Septimius Severus, and Caracalla.

Its bishop Paralius was at the Council of Ephesus (431) and sent his deacon Eucharius to represent him at the Council of Chalcedon (451). Paulus was one of the signatories of the letter by which the bishops of the Roman province of Helenopontus, to which Andrapa belonged, protested to Byzantine Emperor Leo I the Thracian in 458 about the killing of Proterius of Alexandria. Ioannes was at the Third Council of Constantinople (680), Sergius at the Trullan Council (692). Theodorus was represented at the Second Council of Nicaea (787) by his deacon Marinus. Antonius took part in the Photian Council of Constantinople (879).

No longer a residential bishopric, Andrapa is today listed by the Catholic Church as a titular see.

Administrative structure

Municipalities 
 Göl
 Narlısaray

Villages 

 Adatepe
 Ağcaalan
 Ağcayazı
 Ahmetbaba
 Akören
 Alanbaşı
 Alancık
 Alanköy
 Alanşeyhi
 Altınkaya
 Arıca
 Avdan
 Aydınlı
 Aydoğdu
 Ayvalı
 Bahçekonak
 Bahçesaray
 Bakla
 Başalan
 Başfakı
 Bayramköy
 Bektaş
 Belalan
 Beşpınar
 Boğaköy
 Boğazkoru
 Boruk
 Burhaniye
 Büyükkale
 Cebeli
 Çakırtaş
 Çalköy
 Çalman
 Çaltı
 Çamlıca
 Çamlıkonak
 Çekalan
 Çekmeden
 Çeltek
 Çorakdere
 Danabaş
 Darıçay
 Darıçayalanı
 Devalan
 Doyran
 Duruçay
 Elaldı
 Elbeyi
 Elmalı
 Esen
 Esentepe
 Esenyurt
 Göllüalan
 Gömlekhisar
 Güder
 Güldere
 Habipfakı
 Hacılı
 Halilbaba
 Halkahavlı
 Hayranlı
 İmircik
 İncesu
 İnkaya
 Kabalı
 Kadıçayırı
 Kadıoğlu
 Kapaklı
 Kapaklıçeşme
 Kaplancık
 Karabük
 Karacaören
 Karadoruk
 Karaköy
 Karanar
 Karapınar
 Karkucak
 Karlı
 Kavakpınarı
 Kılıçgüney
 Kıranalan
 Kıratbükü
 Kırma
 Kızılcakoru
 Kızılcaören
 Kızılkese
 Kocakaya
 Kovalı
 Köprübaşı
 Kumral
 Kuruçay
 Kuşçular
 Kuyaş
 Kuyumcu
 Küçükkale
 Kületek
 Mahmatlı
 Melikli
 Meşeli
 Mezraa
 Ortaköy
 Oruç
 Ovacık
 Oymaağaç
 Öğürlü
 Örencik
 Özyörük
 Paşaköy
 Pazarcı
 Samukalan
 Samur
 Saraycık
 Sarıalan
 Sarıdibek
 Sarıyar
 Sırbaşmak
 Sofular
 Soğucak
 Susuz
 Şentepe
 Tahtaköprü
 Taşlıyük
 Tatarkale
 Teberük
 Tekkekıranı
 Tepeören
 Türkmen
 Yağcı
 Yağınözü
 Yarbaşı
 Yeniçelik
 Yenidüzce
 Yeşiltepe
 Yolpınar
 Yukarınarlı
 Yurtdağı
 Yürükçal

Literature 
 
 
 
 
 Bekker-Nielsen, T., R. Czichon, C. Høgel, B. Kıvrak, J.M. Madsen, V. Sauer, S.L. Sørensen & K. Winther-Jacobsen 2015. Ancient Neoklaudiopolis (Vezirköprü in Samsun Province): A Historical and Archaeological Guide. Istanbul: Arkeoloji ve Sanat Yayınları.

External links 
 Vezirköprü Information Page
 Vezirköprü Municipality
 Vezirköprü Facebook FanPage
 University of Southern Denmark

References 

 
Populated places in Samsun Province
Paphlagonia